"Chulin Culin Chunfly" is the third single by Puerto Rican reggaeton performer Voltio, from his eponymous second studio album, Voltio. It was released on January 23, 2006, by Sony BMG and White Lion. The album version features Residente of Calle 13, while the remix adds American hip hop group Three 6 Mafia. The music video features Voltio and Residente Calle 13 in various scenes inspired from movies.

Official versions
 Album version (featuring Residente Calle 13) – 4:39
 Remix (featuring Residente Calle 13 and Three 6 Mafia) – 3:41

Chart performance
The single was Voltio's most successful to date, peaking at number eight on the Billboard Hot Latin Songs chart. The album version single, though not as successful, still managed to peak at number 18 on the same chart.

Charts

References

2005 singles
Songs written by Julio Voltio
Julio Voltio songs
Calle 13 (band) songs
Songs written by Residente